Gerda Roux (born 4 December 1973), is a South African athlete who competes in compound archery. After starting archery in June 2012, she achieved international success winning the bronze medal at the major World Archery Federation competition, the World Archery Championships, in 2013. Her husband, Patrick Roux, won a team silver medal at the same event. She has also represented South Africa at the  Archery World Cup.

References

1973 births
Living people
South African female archers
World Archery Championships medalists
Competitors at the 2022 World Games
20th-century South African women
21st-century South African women